Hernán Ezequiel Lopes (born March 28, 1991 in Lomas de Zamora (Buenos Aires), Argentina) is an Argentine footballer currently playing for Guaraní of the Primera División de Paraguay.

Teams
  Lanús 2010-2011
  Atlanta 2011-2013
  Flandria 2013-2014
  Estudiantes de Buenos Aires 2015
  Deportes Iquique 2016–2018
  Guaraní 2019–present

External links
 Profile at BDFA 
 
 

1991 births
Living people
Argentine footballers
Argentine expatriate footballers
Club Atlético Lanús footballers
Club Atlético Atlanta footballers
Estudiantes de Buenos Aires footballers
Flandria footballers
Deportes Iquique footballers
Chilean Primera División players
Argentine Primera División players
Expatriate footballers in Chile
Argentine expatriate sportspeople in Chile
Association football defenders
People from Lomas de Zamora
Sportspeople from Buenos Aires Province